The 2008–09 B.League season was the second season of B.League. The season started on 13 September 2008 and concluded on 17 February 2009.

Abahani Limited Dhaka were the defending champions, and they successfully defended their title.

League System
11 teams participated in the league just like the previous year. Season started on 13 September, 2008 and ended in March 2009.  Each team will play each other home & away twice.  There is no promotion or relegation system.  Teams participating in the league is not allowed to participate in the local league.  As the clubs do not have their own stadium.  Bangladesh Football Federation will distribute stadiums located in & nearby outside Dhaka.  Each team will play 1 match a week.  Matches will be on Friday & Saturday.  Each team will have a 23-member squad which is already announced.  Winner of a match will receive 2 points, lost 0 points & if drawn, 1 point.  There is no limitation for foreign player registration.  But each team can play 3 foreigners at a time.  The league winner will receive a large amount of prize money. The amount is not announced yet.

Qualification
The league champions qualify for AFC President's Cup 2009

Teams
12 teams were added to the league, with Fakirerpool Young Men's Club earning promotion by winning the 2007–08 Dhaka League, however the club was not invited to enter and the season started with 11 teams like the inaugural season.

Venues
 Bangabandhu Stadium
 MA Aziz Stadium
 Khulna Divisional Stadium

League standings

Top scorers

References

 Bangladesh – List of final tables (RSSSF)

Bangladesh Football Premier League seasons
Bangladesh
1
1